Alan "Ollie" Gelfand (born 1963 in New York City) is an American skateboarder and the inventor of the ollie, a skateboarding trick.

Life and career
Gelfand moved from New York City to Hollywood, Florida with his family in 1972. He started skateboarding in 1974 after his father bought him his first skateboard. In 1976, he won the South Florida Skateboard Championships. That same year the first concrete skateboard parks began to appear in the United States with the first being Skateboard City just up the coast in Port Orange, Florida. In 1977, Hollywood would get its own park called Skateboard USA and it would be here that Gelfand would get his first notice in the skate world.  It would be another Hollywood skater by the name of Scott Goodman who would give Gelfand his nickname of "Ollie" and who would name Gelfand's accidental aerial lipslide an Ollie Pop.

Skateboard USA with its imperfect walls was atypical of the first-generation skate parks and it was the over-vertical sections of the park which played a significant role in Gelfand's development of the Ollie Pop. In late 1977, California pro Stacy Peralta visited the Solid Surf Skate Park in Fort Lauderdale where he met Gelfand and observed with some disbelief his no-handed maneuver. By 1978, the Ollie Air was born, known today simply as the ollie.

After Peralta formed Powell Peralta with George Powell, Gelfand was recruited as the first member of the new team by Stacy Peralta. This team later became known as the Bones Brigade and came to include other Florida skaters of the 70s such as Mike McGill, inventor of the 540 aerial or "McTwist" in 1984, and Rodney Mullen who during the 1980s helped foster the ollie for use on flat ground. Tony Hawk would be another Bones Brigade member to benefit from the ollie. On vert he used the maneuver as a way to achieve higher air when doing tricks. By the mid-1980s, the Alan Ollie Gelfand maneuver had transformed trick skating in its three disciplines of vert, freestyle and street. Most skateboard tricks today in street skating are now based on this maneuver.

In the late 1990s, ollie became an official entry in the Oxford English Dictionary but the origin was listed as unknown. After Alan's ex-wife Sharon Gelfand, Sharon Israel at the time, submitted enough citations that proved Alan Gelfand was the first person to ollie, the Oxford English Dictionary in February 2004 rectified the listing giving Alan "Ollie" Gelfand credit as the name and originator behind the 1976 maneuver. In July 2006, the Merriam-Webster followed suit adding Gelfand and his ollie to its dictionary.

Later years
Gelfand stopped skateboarding in 1981 because of knee injuries, general burn-out, and the shutdown of most U.S. skate parks during the previous year.

During the 1980s, Gelfand turned to racing cars, driving Volkswagens and winning many of the Sports Car Club of America SCCA races. In 1987, Gelfand won the World Karting Association or WKA Grand National Championship. From there, he went on to win many 6 hr and 12 hr the most challenging race of all 24-hour races driving VWs. Ollie custom-built in a shop called "Ollieprep". In 2001, Gelfand raced in the IMSA Grand Am Cup behind the wheel of a 2000 model Porsche 986. Gelfand continued racing for another year with visits to the winners' circle in several national competitions.

In 2001, Gelfand returned to skateboarding. In 2002, he built the most perfect bowl in Hollywood, Florida, called Olliewood, which features a 48-foot bowl built by the Team Pain crew. He also owns the most significant dealer alternative for the service of German Vehicles and SUVs called German Car Depot (Name changed from VW DEPOT then to V DEPOT in 2009). In 2015, he purchased Foreign Car of Hollywood and now offers service for all German cars in Hollywood, Florida.

References

Notes

General
 Brooke, M (1999). Concrete Wave: The History of Skateboarding. .
 Grand Am Cup 2000 Yearbook
 Jocko Weyland (2002) The Answer Is Never: A Skateboarder's History of the World 
 Jamie Brisick (HarperCollins, 2004), Have Board, Will Travel: The Definitive History of Surf, Skate, and Snow 
 Craig B. Snyder (Author) 2015 77A Secret History of the Ollie77
 (Oxford Dictionaries)  Oxford English Dictionary77 2004
 Merriam-Webster, Incorporated 2006 Merriam-Webster's Collegiate Dictionary''

External links 
 Alan "Ollie" Gelfand's Homepage
 Olliewood
 Alan Ollie Gelfand's "German Car Depot" in Hollywood Florida Servicing Pembroke Pines Aventura Fort Lauderdale Miami

1963 births
American skateboarders
Living people
Hollywood Hills High School alumni
Jewish American sportspeople
21st-century American Jews